The Wells of Beersheba is a short romanticized account of the Battle of Beersheba, which took place on 31 October 1917 in Ottoman Palestine during the First World War between the attacking mounted infantry of Australia and New Zealand and the defending Ottoman garrison. It was written by the Australian author Frank Dalby Davison who was not present at the battle, but had been in the British cavalry during the war. Much of the book, which is more fictionalized reportage than novella, and in which no single character is drawn, reflects the codependency of horse and rider and the shock of battle.

It was originally published in Sydney in 1933 by Angus & Robertson under the title The Wells of Beersheba. An Epic of the Australian Light Horse 1914-1918, with illustrations by Will Mahoney.

See also

1933 Australian novels
Australian historical novels
Novels set in Ottoman Syria
Novels set during World War I
Fiction set in 1917
Novels set in Palestine (region)
Angus & Robertson books